Zayniddin Tadjiyev (born on 21 June 1977) is a retired Uzbek footballer.

Career

Pakhtakor
He started his playing career at Akademiya Tashkent. From 2002 to 2004 he played for Pakhtakor Tashkent. Playing for Pakhtakor he won several Uzbek League championships and the Uzbek Cup. In the 2008 Uzbek League season Tadjiyev scored 17 goals, following the top goalscorer of the season Server Djeparov with 19 goals. In 2009 Pakhtakor qualified for the quarter-finals of the 2009 AFC Champions League and Tadjiyev was the top goalscorer of the club, scoring 5 goals in the tournament. With 13 goals he is currently the best goalscorer of Pakhtakor in AFC Champions League and one of the all-time top goalscorers of the tournament.

Lokomotiv Tashkent
In 2011, he moved to Lokomotiv Tashkent to play in the Uzbekistan First League. In 2011 season he became the best top goalscorer of First League with 30 goals and gained promotion to the Uzbek League with Lokomotiv. Tadjiyev was also the top goal scorer of Lokomotiv in 2012 season, scoring 11 goals. In 2013, he played the first half of season for Lokomotiv, scoring 4 goals in 9 matches. During the Second half of the 2013 season he played for Neftchi Farg'ona.

Dinamo
In 2014, he moved to Dinamo Samarqand. In February 2015 he left Dinamo and signed a contract with FK Buxoro.

International
Tadjiyev has made 18 appearances for the Uzbekistan national football team, including seven FIFA World Cup qualifying matches, scoring a total of 3 goals.

He has scored a total of 100 goals in the Uzbek League and (as of 7 November 2014), 144 goals in all competitions. This gave him entry to the Gennadi Krasnitsky club of Uzbek top goalscorers.

Career statistics

Goals for National Team

Honours

Club
Pakhtakor
 Uzbek League (4): 2002, 2003, 2004, 2006
 Uzbek League runner-up (3): 2008, 2009, 2010
 Uzbek Cup (4): 2002, 2003, 2004, 2006, 2009
 AFC Champions League semifinal (2): 2003, 2004

Individual
Uzbekistan First League Top Scorer: 2011 (30 goals)

References

External links

 

Living people
1977 births
Uzbekistani footballers
Expatriate footballers in Iran
Uzbekistani Muslims
Uzbekistan international footballers
Pakhtakor Tashkent FK players
FC Kyzylzhar players
Expatriate footballers in China
Tianjin Jinmen Tiger F.C. players
Uzbekistani expatriate sportspeople in China
Chinese Super League players
Association football forwards